Ján Laco (born 1 December 1981) is a former Slovak ice hockey goaltender.

Career
He won the 2012–13 IIHF Continental Cup with HC Donbass and was named the best goaltender in the tournament. On June 30, 2014, Laco signed one-year contract with Barys Astana.

International play

He played for Slovakia at the 2012 Ice Hockey World Championships where he won a silver medal and was named the tournament's top goaltender. Laco was named Slovak goaltender of the year in 2012 and best World Championship 2012 Goalie. Laco was also chosen to the Slovak squad for the Ice hockey at the 2014 Winter Olympics, and took part in one group stage game, the last group stage game against Russia. Slovakia lost the game on penalties, but Laco got a lot of positive comments for his game and the big number of saves he made. Laco also took part in the 5-3 loss game to the Czech Republic.

References

External links
 

1981 births
Living people
HC '05 Banská Bystrica players
Barys Nur-Sultan players
HC 07 Detva players
HC Donbass players
Slovak expatriate sportspeople in Ukraine
Ice hockey players at the 2014 Winter Olympics
Ice hockey players at the 2018 Winter Olympics
HC Košice players
MHk 32 Liptovský Mikuláš players
HC Lev Poprad players
HK Nitra players
Olympic ice hockey players of Slovakia
Sportspeople from Liptovský Mikuláš
Piráti Chomutov players
Slovak ice hockey goaltenders
HC Sparta Praha players
HKM Zvolen players
Slovak expatriate ice hockey players in the Czech Republic
Slovak expatriate sportspeople in Kazakhstan
Expatriate ice hockey players in Ukraine
Expatriate ice hockey players in Kazakhstan